Kenny Schoeni (born January 4, 1984 in Cincinnati, Ohio) is a retired American soccer player.

Career

Youth and College
Schoeni attended Sycamore High School in Cincinnati, Ohio before going to play college soccer at Vanderbilt University from 2003 to 2006, when the Commodores soccer program was discontinued. He finished his undergraduate degree in neuroscience at Vanderbilt and transferred to University of California, Irvine for his final year of eligibility, while attending graduate school. While at Vanderbilt he was named the ESPN The Magazine Academic All-District IV in 2005, was a two-time All-Missouri Valley Conference scholar-athlete, and was named a NSCAA Scholar All-South honorable mention. At UC Irvine he recorded a school record nine shutouts, was named Big West Co-Goalkeeper of the Year, and was named to the All-Big West First Team.

Professional
Undrafted out of college, Schoeni was an MLS pool goalkeeper in 2007. He trained frequently with the Columbus Crew, playing in two MLS Reserve Division games for the team, but never made a senior appearance. He was signed to Columbus's full roster in 2008, but again spent the entire year on the bench, and was waived one week into the 2009 MLS season.

Schoeni signed with Miami FC of the USL First Division in April 2009, and made his debut for the team on June 12, 2009 in a game against the Vancouver Whitecaps.

Schoeni returned to the Crew, for whom he made 5 MLS Reserve Division appearances in 2008, on September 18, 2009, following the conclusion of the 2009 USL season. He made his first MLS start on October 25, 2009 during the Crew's final regular season game, a 1-0 loss to the New England Revolution. Following the game on May 15, 2010 Schoeni retired.

References

External links
 MLS player profile
 Miami FC bio

1984 births
Living people
American soccer players
Columbus Crew players
Miami FC (2006) players
USL First Division players
Major League Soccer players
UC Irvine Anteaters men's soccer players
Vanderbilt Commodores men's soccer players
Soccer players from Cincinnati
Association football goalkeepers
Undrafted Major League Soccer players